Egyptian describes something of, from, or related to Egypt.

Egyptian or Egyptians may refer to:

Nations and ethnic groups
 Egyptians, a national group in North Africa
 Egyptian culture, a complex and stable culture with thousands of years of recorded history
 Egyptian cuisine, the local culinary traditions of Egypt
 Egypt, the modern country in northeastern Africa
 Egyptian Arabic, the language spoken in contemporary Egypt
 A citizen of Egypt; see Demographics of Egypt
 Ancient Egypt, a civilization from c. 3200 BC to 343 BC
 Ancient Egyptians, ethnic people of ancient Egypt
 Ancient Egyptian architecture, the architectural structure style
 Ancient Egyptian cuisine, the cuisine of ancient Egypt
 Egyptian language, the oldest known language of Egypt and a branch of the Afroasiatic language family
 Copts, the ethnic Egyptian Christian minority
 Coptic language or Coptic Egyptian, the latest stage of the Egyptian language, spoken in Egypt until the 17th century, surviving in Coptic liturgy
 Romani people a.k.a. Gypsy, an ethnic group living mostly in Europe and the Americas
 Egyptians (Balkans), an  Albanian-speaking ethnic minority of Kosovo and Macedonia

Art and entertainment 
 Egyptian (band), an American indie rock band
 The Egyptians (band), an English band
 The Egyptian (film), a 1954 film by Michael Curtiz, based on Waltari's novel
 The Egyptian, a 1945 historical novel by Mika Waltari
 Piano Concerto No. 5 (Saint-Saëns) a.k.a. The Egyptian, a piano concerto by Camille Saint-Saëns

Other uses
 Egyptian (typeface), a type of serif typeface characterized by thick, block-like serifs
 The Egyptian (prophet), a nameless 1st-century messianic revolt leader
 Little Egypt (region), something of, from, or related to the region of Southern Illinois
 Egyptian Lover (born 1963), American musician, vocalist, producer and DJ
 Egyptian Healy (1866–1899), pitcher for Major League Baseball in the 19th century
 Egyptian (ship), various ships with that name

See also
 Egypt (disambiguation)
 Egyptienne (disambiguation)
 

Language and nationality disambiguation pages